Nebojša Marinković (born 19 June 1986) is a Serbian professional footballer who plays as an attacking midfielder.

He is the older brother of fellow footballer Nenad Marinković.

Club career

Early years
Born in Knjaževac, Marinković made his first football steps in his hometown club Timočanin. He joined the youth system of Partizan in 2000, becoming a member of their promising generation, together with Borko Veselinović, Milan Smiljanić and Stefan Babović, that won numerous youth tournaments.

Partizan
After already playing for Partizan's affiliated club Teleoptik, Marinković made his official debut for the Crno-beli in the second part of the 2003–04 season under manager Vladimir Vermezović. He signed his first professional contract for Partizan in June 2004, on a five-year deal. However, Marinković failed to make any appearances for the club in the first part of the 2004–05 season, before being loaned to Obilić. He subsequently returned to Partizan and got some playing time in the first part of the 2005–06 season, scoring four goals in seven competitive appearances. However, Marinković was eventually sent on loan to Voždovac in January 2006. He scored six goals in 13 league appearances for Voždovac, as they finished in third place. After returning to Partizan from a successful loan spell, Marinković became a regular member of the starting eleven, finishing the 2006–07 season as the team's top scorer with 14 goals in all competitions.

Israel
In the 2010 winter transfer window, Marinković moved to Israel and signed with Maccabi Petah Tikva. He spent the following four years in the country, also playing for Hapoel Acre and Hapoel Haifa. During that period, Marinković made a total of 99 league appearances and scored 20 goals for these three clubs combined.

Perth Glory
On 20 January 2014, Marinković signed with Perth Glory until the end of the 2014–15 season. He scored his first goal for the club on 30 March 2014, equalizing the score in an eventual 2–1 win over Newcastle Jets. On 14 May 2017, Marinković was released by The Glory.

Later years
In October 2017, Marinković joined Rad on a one-year deal. He left the club after just five games.

In early 2018, Marinković moved to Malaysia and joined Sarawak FA.

International career
Marinković was capped for his country at all youth levels from under-17 to under-21. He represented Serbia and Montenegro at the 2005 UEFA Under-19 Championship, as the team reached the semi-finals of the tournament. Marinković appeared in all four of Serbia and Montenegro's games and scored two goals in the process.

Statistics

Notes

References

External links
 
 
 

A-League Men players
Allsvenskan players
Association football midfielders
Djurgårdens IF Fotboll players
Expatriate footballers in Greece
Expatriate footballers in Israel
Expatriate footballers in Malaysia
Expatriate footballers in Spain
Expatriate footballers in Sweden
Expatriate footballers in Thailand
Expatriate soccer players in Australia
First League of Serbia and Montenegro players
FK Čukarički players
FK Obilić players
FK Partizan players
FK Rad players
FK Teleoptik players
FK Voždovac players
Gimnàstic de Tarragona footballers
Hapoel Acre F.C. players
Hapoel Haifa F.C. players
Iraklis Thessaloniki F.C. players
Israeli Premier League players
Maccabi Petah Tikva F.C. players
Malaysia Premier League players
Marquee players (A-League Men)
Nebojsa Marinkovic
People from Knjaževac
Perth Glory FC players
Segunda División players
Sarawak FA players
Serbia and Montenegro footballers
Serbia under-21 international footballers
Serbian expatriate footballers
Serbian expatriate sportspeople in Australia
Serbian expatriate sportspeople in Greece
Serbian expatriate sportspeople in Israel
Serbian expatriate sportspeople in Malaysia
Serbian expatriate sportspeople in Spain
Serbian expatriate sportspeople in Sweden
Serbian expatriate sportspeople in Thailand
Serbian First League players
Serbian footballers
Serbian SuperLiga players
Super League Greece players
Nebojsa Marinkovic
1986 births
Living people